Patrícia Da Silva (born 1990 in Zürich) is a Swiss-Portuguese model and beauty pageant titleholder who was crowned Miss Universo Portugal 2014 and represented her country at Miss Universe 2014.

Early life 
Silva studied Medicine in Lisbon.

Pageantry

Miss República Portuguesa 2011
Silva was placed as the 1st Runner-up of Miss República Portuguesa 2011, automatically declared as Miss República Portuguesa International 2011. Meanwhile, the reigning winner was Barbara Franco, Miss República Portuguesa World from Riberia Brava. In that year the Miss República Portuguesa had become the national franchise holder of Miss World and Miss International.

Miss International 2011
Silva was represented Portugal at Miss International 2011 in Chengdu, China but she failed to place.

Miss Universo Portugal 2014
Silva was crowned as Miss Portugal Universo 2014 after inviting by Miss República Portuguesa Organization to compete at Miss Portugal Universo 2014. The pageant is in under Miss República Portuguesa Organization after getting MUO license from another "Miss Portugal Organization" who sent its winner for Miss Universe 2011 when the winner was Laura Gonçalves (Placed as the Top 10 at Miss Universe 2011). In 2014 the MRP Organization declared it would hold separate pageant for Miss Universe pageant. During 2014, the organization was held two national pageants, which are Miss Portugal Universo (Special for Miss Universe) and Miss República Portuguesa (For Miss World and Miss International).

Miss Universe 2014
Silva competed at the Miss Universe 2014 pageant but was unplaced.

References

External links
Miss República Portuguesa

1990 births
Living people
People from Lisbon
People from Zürich
Portuguese beauty pageant winners
Swiss people of Portuguese descent
Citizens of Portugal through descent
Miss Universe 2014 contestants
Miss International 2011 delegates